The 2007 Toyota Grand Prix of Long Beach was the second round of the 2007 Champ Car World Series Season, held on April 15 on the streets of Long Beach, California.

Qualifying results

note: Paul Tracy was injured in practice between Q1 and Q2. Oriol Servia replaced him and drove his backup car in Q2 and will drive in the race.

Grid

Race

Caution flags

Notes

 New Race Record: Sébastien Bourdais: 1:40:43.975 (78 Laps)

Championship standings after the race

Drivers' Championship standings

 Note: Only the top five positions are included.

Attendance
Attendance at the 2007 Toyota Grand Prix of Long Beach was approximately 200,000 people over the race weekend with 100,000 of those fans in attendance for the Champ Car main event. This represented a 10% increase over 2006.

References

External links
 Full Weekend Times & Results
 Race Box Score
 Drivers Standings After Race

Long Beach
Grand Prix of Long Beach